La trovatella di Pompei (i.e. "The foundling of Pompei") is a 1957 Italian  melodrama film co-written and directed by Giacomo Gentilomo and starring Massimo Girotti and Alessandra Panaro.

Plot  
Pompeii. Maria, is a girl raised by the loving care of a poor couple but without knowing anything about her real parents. She is in love with Giorgio, a boy from a good family, who however has also aroused the interest of the intriguing Edvige who frequents bad company including jealous Roberto. Edvige wants to meet Giorgio with the intention of telling him that Maria is a foundling therefore not worthy to be by his side but later has a clash with Roberto who hits her and kills her. There would be a witness but Roberto, threatening him with death, succeeds in obtaining his silence, the blame therefore falls on Maria, who arrived shortly after the crime attracted by the noises with the intention of bringing help. During the trial Guglielmo, the public prosecutor, lashes out with fury against the girl, a clear example that evil (a father who has abandoned her can only be a criminal) can only give birth to other evil. Fortunately, an old servant of the magistrate remembers what happened years before, Maria is the natural daughter of Guglielmo, forced by the family to leave the birth in an orphanage in Pompeii. Shocked by the news, the magistrate begins to use calmer and less violent tones but the witness arrives at the very end to clarify the truth about the crime and Maria can finally marry her beloved Giorgio.

Cast 

Alessandra Panaro as Maria Molinaro
Massimo Girotti as Guglielmo 
Carlo Giustini as  Roberto
Antonio De Teffé as  Giorgio
Tina Lattanzi as  Baroness Curti
Tecla Scarano as  Donna Nunziata
Philippe Hersent as  Mariano
Michele Abruzzo as  Molinaro
 Ilse Peterson as  Edvige
Wandisa Guida as  Lucia
 Giorgio Costantini as  The Commissioner
 Armando Romeo as  Musician 
Marco Tulli as Musician 
Franca Dominici
Franca Bettoja

References

External links

1957 drama films
1957 films
Italian drama films
Films directed by Giacomo Gentilomo
Italian black-and-white films
Melodrama films
1950s Italian films
1950s Italian-language films